The All the Hits Tour was a 2017 summer concert tour by American singer-songwriters Lionel Richie and Mariah Carey. The tour was scheduled to begin on March 15, 2017, at the Royal Farms Arena in Baltimore. The tour was delayed due to Richie's longer than expected recovery from a knee procedure and began in summer 2017.

Set list

Tour dates

Cancelled shows

References 

2017 concert tours
Mariah Carey concert tours
Co-headlining concert tours
Lionel Richie